Escoheag Hill is a hill off Escoheag Hill Road in West Greenwich, Rhode Island. The hill was the site of the former Pine Top Ski Area.

The ski area opened in the 1965-66 season and had two T-Bar lifts, night skiing, and snowmaking. For a short period in the 1970s, there was also a summertime motorcycle park. The ski area closed around 1980, and the ski lodge burned in the mid-1980s. The area is now part of the Arcadia Management Area.

References

Hills of Rhode Island
Landforms of Washington County, Rhode Island
Ski areas and resorts in Rhode Island
Exeter, Rhode Island
Tourist attractions in Washington County, Rhode Island